Ambondromamy is a town and commune in Madagascar. It belongs to the district of Ambato-Boeni, which is a part of Boeny Region. The population of the commune was estimated to be approximately 8,000 in 2001 commune census.

Primary and junior level secondary education are available in town. The majority 60% of the population of the commune are farmers, while an additional 30% receives their livelihood from raising livestock. The most important crop is peanuts, while other important products are maize and sweet potatoes.  Services provide employment for 5% of the population. Additionally fishing employs 5% of the population.

Geography 
Ambondromamy is situated at the intersection of the Route nationale 6 (to Diego Suarez) and RN 4 (Mahajanga - Antananarivo).

Fossils
Some species of dinausaurs were discovert in Ambondromamy.

References and notes 

Populated places in Boeny